The Ministry of Communications was a governmental agency in Turkmenistan responsible for telecommunications, post, Internet, television, and radio. The ministry was founded in 1991 and was abolished in connection with the creation of the Ministry of Industry and Communication of Turkmenistan on 29 January 2019.

Ministry building 
On 1 April 2011, a new building of the Ministry was commissioned in Ashgabat. The building housed the offices of Turkmentelecom and Turkmenpochta. The building was erected along Archabil Avenue in Ashgabat.

Structure 
The following enterprises operated under the Ministry of Communications of the Republic of Turkmenistan:
 Turkmentelecom
 Altyn Asyr
 Teleradiomerkezy
 Turkmenpochta
 Ashgabat City Telephone Network
 State Inspectorate for the Supervision of Radio Frequency Use
 Center for International Settlements and Contracts.
 Vocational School #5

List of heads

See also

 Telecommunications in Turkmenistan

References

Communications
Turkmenistan
Ministries established in 1991
1991 establishments in Turkmenistan
Ministries disestablished in 2019
21st-century disestablishments in Turkmenistan